The following is a list of video editing software.

The criterion for inclusion in this list is the ability to perform non-linear video editing. Most modern transcoding software supports transcoding a portion of a video clip, which would count as cropping and trimming. However, items in this article have one of the following conditions:
 Can perform other non-linear video editing function such as montage or compositing
 Can do the trimming or cropping without transcoding

Free (libre) or open-source
The software listed in this section is either free software or open source, and may or may not be commercial.

Active and stable 

Avidemux (Linux, macOS, Windows)
Losslesscut (Linux, macOS, Windows)
Blender VSE (Linux, FreeBSD, macOS, Windows)
Cinelerra (Linux, FreeBSD)
FFmpeg (Linux, macOS, Windows) – CLI only; no visual feedback
Flowblade (Linux)
Kdenlive (Linux, FreeBSD, macOS, Windows)
LiVES (BSD, IRIX, Linux, Solaris)
Olive (Linux, macOS, Windows) - currently in alpha
OpenShot (Linux, FreeBSD, macOS, Windows)
Pitivi (Linux, FreeBSD)
Shotcut (Linux, FreeBSD, macOS, Windows)

Inactive 

Kino (Linux, FreeBSD)
VirtualDub (Windows)
VirtualDubMod (Windows)
VideoLan Movie Creator (VLMC) (Linux, macOS, Windows)

Proprietary (non-commercial)
The software listed in this section is proprietary, and freeware or freemium.

Active

ActivePresenter (Windows) – Also screencast software
DaVinci Resolve (macOS, Windows, Linux)
Freemake Video Converter (Windows)
iMovie (iOS, macOS)
ivsEdits (Windows)
Lightworks (Windows, Linux, macOS)
Microsoft Photos (Windows)
showbox.com (Windows, macOS)
VideoPad Home Edition (Windows, macOS, iPad, Android)
VSDC Free Video Editor (Windows)
WeVideo (Web app)

Discontinued 

Adobe Premiere Express (Web app)
Pixorial (Web app)
VideoThang (Windows)
Windows Movie Maker (Windows)

Proprietary (commercial)
The software listed in this section is proprietary and commercial.

Active

Adobe After Effects (macOS, Windows)
Adobe Premiere Elements (macOS, Windows)
Adobe Premiere Pro (macOS, Windows)
Adobe Presenter Video Express (macOS, Windows) – Also screencast software
Avid Media Composer (Windows, macOS)
AVS Video Editor (Windows)
Blackbird (macOS, Windows, Linux)
Camtasia (Windows, macOS) – Also screencast software
Corel VideoStudio (Windows)
Cyberlink PowerDirector (Windows, macOS)
DaVinci Resolve Studio (macOS, Windows, Linux)
Edius (Windows)
Final Cut Pro X (macOS)
Kaltura (Web app)
Magix Movie Edit Pro (Windows)
Magix Vegas Pro (Windows) - previously Sony Vegas Pro
Media 100 Suite (macOS)
muvee Reveal (Windows, macOS)
Nacsport Video Analysis Software (Windows)
Pinnacle Studio (Windows)
Roxio Creator (Windows)
ScreenFlow (macOS)
Video Toaster (Windows, hardware suite)
VideoPad Masters Edition (Windows, macOS, iPad, Android)
Xedio (Windows)

Discontinued 

ArcSoft ShowBiz (Windows)
Autodesk Smoke (macOS)
Avid DS (Windows)
Clesh (Java on OS X, Windows, Linux)
Final Cut Express (OS X)
MPEG Video Wizard DVD (Windows)
Serif MoviePlus (Windows)
Pinnacle Videospin (Windows)
Xpress Pro (Windows, OS X)

See also

Comparison of video editing software
Comparison of video converters
Photo slideshow software
Video editing

References

 
Video editors